Youth's Gamble is a 1925 American silent action film directed by Albert S. Rogell and starring Reed Howes, James Thompson and Margaret Morris.

Cast
 Reed Howes as William Ignatius Newton
 James Thompson as Addison Simms
 Margaret Morris as Hazel Dawn
 Wilfred Lucas as Harry Blaine
 Gale Henry as Winifred Elaine Thomas
 William Buckley as Tombstone Reilly
 David Kirby as Obituary Blake

References

Bibliography
 Rainey, Buck. Sweethearts of the Sage: Biographies and Filmographies of 258 actresses appearing in Western movies. McFarland & Company, 1992.

External links
 

1925 films
1920s action films
1920s English-language films
American silent feature films
American action films
American black-and-white films
Rayart Pictures films
Films directed by Albert S. Rogell
1920s American films
Silent action films